Wisbech railway station may refer to one of several railway stations that served the town of Wisbech in Cambridgeshire, England:

 Wisbech North railway station
 Wisbech East railway station
 Wisbech railway station (Upwell Tramway)
 A proposed station to be built on any revived March to Wisbech railway service; see Bramley Line